Suman Banerjee is the David J. DeWitt Professor of computer science at the University of Wisconsin–Madison. He was named an ACM Fellow in 2020 for his contributions to research in the area of wireless systems and an IEEE Fellow in 2022 for his contributions to the "development of tools to improve performance and usability of wireless systems". He has been cited more than 28,000 times (April 2021).

References 

Living people
University System of Maryland alumni
Year of birth missing (living people)